Bill Connor (born 1939) is a former American football, baseball, and wrestling coach.  He served as the head football coach Ripon College in Ripon, Wisconsin from 1973 to 1975, Lock Haven State College—now known as Lock Haven University of Pennsylvania—from 1976 to 1977, the Montana State School of Mines—now known as Montana Tech of the University of Montana–from 1978 to 1980, Pacific University in Forest Grove, Oregon from 1981 to 1984, and the University of Wisconsin–Superior from 1988 to 1989, compiling a career college football coaching record of 44–77–4.  Connor also coached baseball and wrestling at Ripon.

Connor graduated from Messmer High School in Milwaukee and the University of Wisconsin–La Crosse.  He joined the football coaching staff at Ripon as an assistant in 1967.

Head coaching record

College football

Notes

References

1939 births
Living people
Lock Haven Bald Eagles football coaches
Montana Tech Orediggers football coaches
Mary Marauders football coaches
Pacific Boxers athletic directors
Pacific Boxers football coaches
Ripon Red Hawks baseball coaches
Ripon Red Hawks football coaches
Wisconsin–Superior Yellowjackets football coaches
College wrestling coaches in the United States
high school football coaches in Wisconsin
high school wrestling coaches in the United States
University of Wisconsin–La Crosse alumni
Sportspeople from Milwaukee